Kevin Meyer may refer to:
Kevin Meyer (director), American filmmaker, director and writer
Kevin Meyer (politician) (born 1956), American politician

See also
Kevin Mayer (born 1992), French athlete
Kevin A. Mayer (born 1962), American business executive 
Kevin Myers (born 1947), English-born Irish journalist and writer